Jitesh Pillaai is an Indian journalist editor of Filmfare magazine. He is also the host of the famously Filmfare tv show.

References

Year of birth missing (living people)
Living people
Indian newspaper journalists
Indian magazine editors